A candlelight vigil or candlelit vigil is an outdoor assembly of people carrying candles, held after sunset in order to show support for a specific cause. Such events are typically held either to protest the suffering of some marginalized group of people, or in memory of the dead. In the latter case, the event is often called a candlelight memorial. A large candlelight vigil will usually have invited speakers with a public address system and may be covered by local or national media. Speakers give their speech at the beginning of the vigil to explain why they are holding a vigil and what it represents. Vigils may also have a religious or spiritual purpose. On Christmas Eve many churches hold a candlelight vigil.

Candlelight vigils are seen as a nonviolent way to raise awareness of a cause and to motivate change, as well as uniting and supporting those attending the vigil.

Candlelight vigils in South Korea 

In South Korea, the Candlelight vigils, or Candlelight protests is a symbolic collective gathering of political dissent in South Korea to combat injustice peacefully. This method of protesting began in 2002 as a result of the Yangju highway incident, was utilized in the rallies against the impeachment of Roh Moo-hyun in 2004, re-used again in the 2008 U.S. beef protests, and emerged in the 2016-18 President Park Geun-hye protests.

Gallery

See also
 Grave candle

References

External links

 American Medical Students Association, Planning Candle Light Vigils
 "Example Candle Light Vigil for the Little Ambassador"

Candles
Death customs
Meetings
Protest tactics